Rasht Airport  is an international airport located 10 kilometers north of the city of Rasht, Gilan Province, in the north of Iran. It is also known as Sardar Jangal Airport. It has flight connections to  different parts of Iran, and about 446,000 passengers passed through it in 2017.

Airlines and destinations

See also
Iran Civil Aviation Organization
Transport in Iran
List of airports in Iran
List of the busiest airports in Iran
List of airlines of Iran

References

Airports in Iran
Buildings and structures in Gilan Province
Transportation in Gilan Province